The Underwood Stakes is a Melbourne Racing Club Group 1 Thoroughbred horse race,  run over 1800 metres under weight-for-age conditions, held at Caulfield Racecourse, Melbourne, Australia in late September each year. Total prize money for the race is A$ 1,000,000.

History

It has been won by notable champions of the past such as Heroic, Phar Lap, Ajax, Tobin Bronze, Octagonal and Northerly.

Prior to 1994 the race was held on Royal Melbourne Show Day which used to be observed on the Thursday in the last full week of September as a public holiday.

1952 racebook

Venue
 1924–1947 held by Williamstown Racing Club at Williamstown Racecourse.
 1948 onwards held at Caulfield Racecourse.
2021 - 2022 held at  Sandown Racecourse (Hillside track).

Grade
1924–1978 - Principal Race
1979 onwards Group 1

Distance
 1924–1948 - 1 mile (~1600m)
 1943 - 7 furlongs (~1400m)
 1949–1953 held over 1 miles (~1800m)
 1954–1971 held over 1 miles (~2000m)
 1972–1993 held over 2000m
 1994 onwards held over 1800m.
 Note: two runnings in 1944.

Winners

 2022 - Alligator Blood
 2021 - Zaaki
 2020 - Russian Camelot
 2019 - Black Heart Bart
 2018 - Homesman
 2017 - Bonneval
 2016 - Black Heart Bart
 2015 - Mourinho
 2014 - Foreteller
 2013 - It's a Dundeel
 2012 - Ocean Park
 2011 - Lion Tamer
 2010 - So You Think
 2009 - Heart Of Dreams
 2008 - Weekend Hussler
 2007 - Rubiscent
 2006 - El Segundo
 2005 - Perlin
 2004 - Elvstroem
 2003 - Mummify
 2002 - Northerly
 2001 - Northerly
 2000 - Oliver Twist
 1999 - Intergaze
 1998 - Tie the Knot
 1997 - Always Aloof
 1996 - Octagonal
 1995 - Sharscay
 1994 - Jeune
 1993 - Runyon
 1992 - Prince Salieri
 1991 - Dr. Grace
 1990 - The Phantom
 1989 - Almaarad
 1988 - Authaal
 1987 - Rubiton
 1986 - Bonecrusher
 1985 - Tristarc
 1984 - Bounty Hawk
 1983 - Trissaro
 1982 - Fearless Pride
 1981 - Sovereign Red
 1980 - †My Brown Jug / Waitangirua 
 1979 - Valley Of Georgia
 1978 - So Called
 1977 - Denise's Joy
 1976 - How Now
 1975 - Taras Bulba
 1974 - Frozen Section
 1973 - Scotch And Dry
 1972 - Sobar
 1971 - Gay Icarus
 1970 - Big Philou
 1969 - Rain Lover
 1968 - Lowland
 1967 - Future
 1966 - Tobin Bronze
 1965 - Future
 1964 - Contempler
 1963 - Havelock
 1962 - Aquanita
 1961 - Aquanita
 1960 - Lord
 1959 - Trellios
 1958 - Lord
 1957 - Syntax
 1956 - Ray Ribbon
 1955 - Cromis
 1954 - Flying Halo
 1953 - Flying Halo
 1952 - Ellerslie
 1951 - Laurie Hussar
 1950 - Beau Gem
 1949 - Beau Gem
 1948 - Royal Gem
 1947 - Attley
 1946 - Attley
 1945 - St. Fairy
 1944 - ‡Amana / Tea Cake
 1943 - Gay Revelry
 1942 - race not held
 1941 - Sun Valley
 1940 - Ajax
 1939 - Ajax
 1938 - Ajax
 1937 - Young Idea
 1936 - Peter Fils
 1935 - Young Idea
 1934 - Hall Mark 
 1933 - Hall Mark 
 1932 - Liberal
 1931 - Phar Lap
 1930 - Waterline
 1929 - Highland
 1928 - Highland
 1927 - Royal Charter
 1926 - Heroic
 1925 - Whittier
 1924 - Whittier

† Dead heat 
‡ Run in divisions

See also
 List of Australian Group races
Group races

References

Australian Studbook - MRC Underwood Stakes Race Winners

Open mile category horse races
Group 1 stakes races in Australia
Caulfield Racecourse